Kaleva was a civilian Junkers Ju 52 passenger and transport airplane belonging to the Finnish carrier Aero O/Y. On 14 June 1940, as Flight 1631 from Tallinn in Estonia to Helsinki in Finland, the aircraft was shot down over the Gulf of Finland by two Soviet Ilyushin DB-3 bombers, killing all nine on board. The incident occurred during the Interim Peace between the Soviet Union and Finland, and at the outset of the Soviet occupation of Estonia. Kaleva was the second civilian passenger airplane ever to be attacked midair, and the first airliner in history to be shot down in flight, by hostile aircraft.

Incident
A few minutes after taking off from Tallinn, Aero Flight 1631 was joined at close range by two Soviet DB-3T torpedo bombers. The bombers opened fire with their machine guns and badly damaged Kaleva, making it crash into the water a few kilometers northeast of Keri Lighthouse. All nine passengers and crew members on board were killed.

Estonian fishermen had witnessed the attack and crash of the plane. Shortly after the crash the Soviet submarine Shch-301 (Щ-301) surfaced and inspected the fishing boats. After confiscating items taken from the wreck by the fishermen, the Soviets picked up diplomatic mail from the wreck and the sea. The future top-scoring Finnish pilot Ilmari Juutilainen was sent to inspect the crash site. After the Soviets spotted the Finnish airplane, the submarine hid its flag.

At the time of the incident Finland was not at war with the Soviet Union. The attack was probably part of the Soviet preparations for the full-scale occupation of Estonia, which took place two days after the Kaleva incident, on 16 June 1940. The occupation was preceded for several days by a Soviet air and naval blockade, which included preventing diplomatic mail from being sent abroad from Estonia. The passengers on the last flight of Kaleva included two German businessmen, two French embassy couriers, one Swede, an American courier, and an Estonian woman. The American courier was reportedly transporting the U.S. military codes to safety from Estonia.

The government of Finland did not send any complaints or questions to the Soviets out of fear of hostile Soviet response, and the true reason for the crash was hidden from the public. This was due to the heavy pressure put upon Finland during the Interim Peace by the Soviets. After the outbreak of the Continuation War, the incident was described in detail by the government.

G. Goldberg's report

The commander of Shch-301 G. Goldberg's report on the incident held in the Russian State Naval Archives starts with the notice of a Finnish airplane on its way from Tallinn to Helsinki on 14 June 1940 at 15.05 PM. According to the report, the airplane was chased by two Soviet Tupolev SB high-speed bombers. At 15.06 PM, the Finnish airplane caught fire and fell into the sea,  from the submarine. At 15.09 PM the submarine set course to the crash site and made it to the location by 15.47 PM. The submarine was met by three Estonian fishing boats near the detritus of the airplane. The Estonian fishermen were searched by lieutenants Aladzhanov, Krainov and Shevtshenko.
At 15.58 a Finnish fighter plane was noticed on course towards the submarine. The airplane made three circles above the site and then flew towards Helsinki.

A. Matvejev's report
Captain A. Matvejev's report states that on board the Shch-301 noticed an airplane crash on 14 June 1940 at 15.06 on  distance from the submarine. At the crash site three Estonian fishing boats and the remains of the airplane were found. At 15.58 PM a Finnish fighter plane made three circles above the crash site. By 16.10 PM all items found from the sea and from the hands of the fishermen were brought on board the submarine. All items were put on board of patrol boat Sneg and sent to Kronstadt.

Victims 

The plane was piloted by Captain Bo von Willebrand, and Tauno Launis was the wireless operator. The American victim was Henry W. Antheil Jr., younger brother of noted composer George Antheil. Antheil worked as a clerk at the U.S. Legation in Helsinki. In 2007, he was honored for his service in a ceremony at the U.S. Department of State. His name was inscribed on the U.S. Department of State's Wall of Honor. The French victim was mathematician Frédéric Marty, who worked for the French embassy in Tallinn.

 Bo Hermansson von Willebrand (captain)
 Tauno Launis (co-pilot)
 Henry W. Antheil Jr. (American diplomat)
 Frédéric Marty (French diplomatic courier)
 Paul Longuet (French diplomatic courier) 
 Rudolf Cöllen (Germany)
 Friedrich-Wilhelm Offermann (Germany)
 Max Hettinger (Sweden)
 Gunvor Maria Luts (Finnish-born Estonian citizen)

In popular culture
The shootdown of Kaleva is a central event in the novel trilogy Litsid (The Whores, 2015-2018) by the Estonian author Mart Sander and in the TV series of the same name (2018). The book follows the theory proposing that Henry Antheil (played in the series by Matt Fien) was tasked with transporting the last remaining gold from the Estonian gold depository (11 bars) to Finland, only days before the Soviet occupation began. There were 227 kilograms of diplomatic luggage on the plane. Another theory suggests that the orders came straight from Stalin, who was convinced that Estonian president Konstantin Päts was trying to flee the country on it.

See also
List of airliner shootdown incidents

Notes

References

 Gummerus, Vuosisatamme kronikka, p. 543. 1987. 

Mass murder in 1940
Airliner shootdown incidents
Accidents and incidents involving the Junkers Ju 52
Aviation accidents and incidents in 1940
Aviation accidents and incidents in Estonia
Aviation accidents and incidents in Finland
Finland–Soviet Union relations
Finnair accidents and incidents
Military history of the Soviet Union 
Soviet war crimes 
1940 in Estonia 
1940 in Finland 
20th-century aircraft shootdown incidents 
Individual aircraft